Christophe Detilloux (born 3 May 1974 in Rocourt) is a Belgian former professional road bicycle racer, who currently works as a directeur sportif for UCI ProTeam  and its junior team, UCI Continental team .

Major results 

1994
 3rd Internatie Reningelst
1995
 3rd Zellik–Galmaarden
1997
 1st Boucle de l'Artois
 4th GP de la Ville de Rennes
1999
 2nd Druivenkoers Overijse
 2nd Schaal Sels
2000
 8th Kampioenschap van Vlaanderen
2002
 4th Tour de Vendée
 8th Kampioenschap van Vlaanderen

References

External links 

Belgian male cyclists
1974 births
Living people
Sportspeople from Liège
Cyclists from Liège Province